Es doger is an Indonesian coconut milk-based shaved ice beverage with pinkish color often served as a dessert. It is a specialty of Bandung, West Java. The main, or base, part is sugared sweet coconut milk-based ice in pink syrup, served with pacar cina merah delima (red tapioca pearls), avocado, cassava tapai, ketan hitam (black glutinous rice) tapai, jackfruit, diced bread and condensed milk. The condensed milk can be plain (white), or chocolate flavoured. Es doger gains its pinkish color from rozen (rose) syrup, cocopandan syrup, or pink food coloring. Es doger is commonly sold by travelling vendor carts in major Indonesian cities, mainly in Bandung, Jakarta, Malang and Surabaya.

Similar drink
The Malaysian ais Bandung (Bandung ice) of coconut milk ice with pink rose syrup is actually quite similar to es doger, albeit with lesser content. Both drinks has pinkish hue, and es doger is often associated with the city of Bandung. Yet the relations between the two drinks are uncertain.

See also

 Es campur
 Es teler
 Halo-halo
 Kakigōri
 Cendol
 Ais kacang

References

External links
 Es Doger Recipe (in Indonesian)
 Es Doger Recipe from Femina (in Indonesian)

Indonesian desserts
Foods containing coconut
Street food in Indonesia